The Atuel River is a river located mainly in the south of the Argentine province of Mendoza, with its last part in La Pampa. It is a tributary of the Desaguadero River.

The Atuel is the longest river in Mendoza. Its volume increases from November to March (around the summer).

Canyon

Immediately after El Nihuil, the river becomes entrenched along a canyon and forms rapids. This level difference is taken advantage of by four hydroelectric power stations (Nihuil I, II, III and IV). Most of the Atuel's flow at this point has been redirected through a system of tunnels inside the mountains, connecting the chain of reservoirs.

The Atuel Canyon area is a major tourist attraction, featuring hotels, camping sites, country clubs and other lodging facilities. The rapids are employed for rafting and canoeing; they are classified between class II (novice) and IV (advanced) in the International Scale of River Difficulty.

The canyon ends at Rincón del Atuel. From there on the river flows along a plain, becoming wider and meandering until reaching the Desaguadero River.

References
 El Baqueano, San Rafael, Río Atuel.
 WelcomeArgentina. Adrenaline Guaranteed.

Rivers of Mendoza Province
Rivers of La Pampa Province
Rivers of Argentina